The 2007 Tulane Green Wave football team represented Tulane University in the 2007 NCAA Division I FBS football season. The Green Wave played their home games at the Louisiana Superdome. They competed in the West Division of Conference USA. The team was coached by first-year head coach Bob Toledo. The team finished the season 4–8, 3–5 in C-USA - tied for third place in the West Division.

Schedule

Personnel

Season summary

at Army

References

Tulane
Tulane Green Wave football seasons
Tulane Green Wave football